The Xiaoyue Tunnel is an expressway tunnel in Beijing, China, and forms part of the Western 5th Ring Road.

Road transport in Beijing
Road tunnels in China
Buildings and structures in Beijing